"Hurra, hurra, die Schule brennt" (English: "Hooray, Hooray, the School Is Burning") is a song originally recorded by German band Extrabreit in 1980 and remixed in 1990. The title of the song is derived from the 1969 West German film Hurra, die Schule brennt!

Track listing
Original release

Charts

Weekly charts

Year-end charts

90 Remix

Busted cover

In 2003, the song was covered by English pop punk band Busted, who released it as a single in Continental Europe as an alternative to the British and Irish only release "Sleeping with the Light On". It was included on the German edition of their debut album, Busted. The Busted version rewrites the verses in English, but keeps the chorus in German. The song was only ever intended for release in Germany, Austria and Switzerland, but its video and the track subsequently appeared as B-sides to the CD2 and cassette releases of "Crashed the Wedding" respectively, after fans demanded it be released in the United Kingdom. The song has since been released in the UK as a download.

Track listing
 CD1
 "Hurra, hurra, die Schule brennt" - 3:35
 "You Said No" - 2:47 (clean version)
 "Last Summer" - 3:05
 "Hurra, hurra, die Schule brennt" (Video) - 3:35

 CD2
 "Hurra, hurra, die Schule brennt" - 3:35
 "Sleeping with the Light On" (New Version) - 3:14
 "Year Three School Said No" (Medley) - 5:18
 "Sleeping with the Light On" (Live Video) - 3:40

 Cassette Single
 "Hurra, hurra, die Schule brennt" - 3:35
 "You Said No" (Live Version) - 3:18

Chart performance

References

2003 singles
Busted (band) songs
1980 songs
Song recordings produced by Steve Robson
MCA Records singles